Soldier of fortune or Soldier of Fortune may refer to:

Mercenary, sometimes known as a soldier of fortune

Film 
 Soldier of Fortune (1955 film), starring Clark Gable and Susan Hayward
 Soldier of Fortune (1976 film), an Italian film starring Bud Spencer
 Laser Mission, a 1990 film also titled Soldier of Fortune, featuring Brandon Lee and Ernest Borgnine
 Soldiers of Fortune (1919 film), a lost American silent drama
 Soldiers of Fortune (2012 film), an action comedy starring Sean Bean, Ving Rhames and Christian Slater

Television 
 Soldier of Fortune, Inc., a 1997–1998 television show (later renamed Special Ops Force)
 Soldiers of Fortune (TV series), a 1955 television series
 Soldier of Fortune (1982 TV series), a TVB television series

Video games 
 Soldier of Fortune (video game), a 2000 first-person shooter game created by Raven Software 
 Soldier of Fortune II: Double Helix, 2002 sequel
 Soldier of Fortune: Payback, 2007 sequel
 The Chaos Engine, a 1993 action game, sold as Soldiers of Fortune in the United States 
 Soldier of Fortune, a Commodore 64 game
 Soldier of Fortune, a ZX Spectrum game

Literature 
 Soldiers of Fortune, an 1897 novel by Richard Harding Davis
 Soldier of Fortune, a 2003 biography about Emil Lewis Holmdahl by Douglas V. Meed
 Soldier of Fortune (magazine), a mercenary magazine

Music

Albums 
 Soldiers of Fortune (album), a 1986 album by Outlaws
 Soldier of Fortune (Loudness album) a 1989 album by Loudness
 Soldier of Fortune (Eric Burdon album), a 1997 album by Eric Burdon

Songs 
 "Soldier of Fortune" (Deep Purple song) (1974)
 "Soldier of Fortune" (John Paul Young song) (1983)
 "Soldier of Fortune", from Bad Reputation (1977) by Thin Lizzy
 "Soldier of Fortune", from I've Got the Rock'n'Rolls Again (1981) by The Joe Perry Project
 "Soldier of Fortune", from Bodies and Souls (1983) by The Manhattan Transfer
 "Soldier of Fortune", from Soldier of Fortune (1989) by Loudness
 "Soldier of Fortune", from Ghost Reveries (2005) by Opeth
 "Soldier of Fortune", from End of Disclosure (2013) by Hypocrisy

Other uses 
 Soldier of Fortune (horse), 2007 Irish Derby winner